Crile is a tiny lunar impact crater. It is roughly circular and cup-shaped, with interior walls that slope down to the midpoint. The crater lies in the Palus Somni, between the Mare Crisium to the east and Mare Tranquillitatis to the west.

This formation was previously designated Proclus F before being renamed by the IAU in 1976. Proclus itself is located to the north-northeast. The crater is named for American surgeon, George Washington Crile.

References

External links
 LTO-61B2 Glaisher, Lunar Topographic Orthophotomap (LTO) Series

Impact craters on the Moon